Frank McDonough is a British historian of the Third Reich and international history.

Life

Francis (Frank) Xavier McDonough was born on 17 April 1957 in Liverpool. He read modern History at Balliol College, Oxford, as a Senior Status Scholar. He was at Balliol at the same time as Boris Johnson and knew him. He later earned a PhD in history from Lancaster University, under the supervision of Ruth Henig. He was Professor of International History in the History Department of the School of Humanities and Social Science at Liverpool John Moores University until his retirement in 2021. He is an avid Liverpool F.C. fan and still lives in Liverpool with his partner Ann.

Work
His key area of research is international history, particularly Anglo-German relations in the 20th century. He has published significant works on the origins of World War I and World War II. McDonough is increasingly publishing his research on the Third Reich, including opposition to Hitler, the Holocaust and the Gestapo.

Neville Chamberlain and appeasement

In his study of Neville Chamberlain, Appeasement and the British Road to War, published in 1998, McDonough outlined a 'post-revisionist' theory, which built on the work of R. A. C. Parker's 1994 book Chamberlain and Appeasement, by expanding it to include appeasement in society and looking at economic appeasement, the mass media and the opponents of appeasement. McDonough accepted that appeasement was probably the only choice for the British government in the 1930s, but unlike the revisionists he argued that it was poorly implemented, carried out too late and not enforced strongly enough to constrain Hitler. He suggested that appeasement must be analysed as a usable policy at the time it operated and focus on how Chamberlain's personality played a crucial role in the conduct of the policy, in particular, his errors of judgement, his failure to listen to opponents and his unwillingness to try any alternatives. McDonough argues that Chamberlain's version of appeasement, as operated by such an inflexible politician, unwilling to change direction, until events forced him to, actually contributed to Britain and France entering the war in 1939 in a much weaker strategic position, and passed the early advantage in the war to Hitler's regime, which meant that Germany only faced one European front until June 1944.

The study was reviewed in academic journals. Parker described it as "very well written, with a lively argument, which explores appeasement in society too". Andrew Thorpe, a leading authority on foreign affairs, described the book as "a cogent and stimulating analysis of appeasement which will take the debate still deeper". A leading US historian of foreign affairs from the Reed College, Edward B. Segel, commented: "The book brings out effectively how the British government manipulated the mass-media, the press and especially the BBC to exclude public criticism of Chamberlain's policies and convey the impression of overwhelming support".

McDonough is one of the most prominent 'post-revisionist' experts on Neville Chamberlain and the policy of appeasement, along with Parker, who was, as Sydney Aster points out, his "academic mentor while he was at Oxford".

Other books

In McDonough's 2007 monograph, The Conservative Party and Anglo-German Relations, 1905–1914, published by Palgrave Macmillan, he moved the focus of analysis to the Conservative Party's role in the outbreak of the First World War. The study was described in a review in the journal The Bulletin of the German Institute of Historical Research by a German foreign policy scholar as "a thorough and thought-provoking analysis, which draws on over thirty archives and provides a powerful and overdue corrective to the traditional depiction of the Edwardian Conservative Party as 'Scaremongers' and the chief promoters of Germanophobic views among British political parties in the years that led to the outbreak of the First World War".

In addition, to his research on Anglo-German relations, McDonough has written a number of publications on the related subject of the history of the Third Reich, most notably, Hitler and Nazi Germany (1999); Opposition and Resistance in Nazi Germany (2001); and Hitler and the Rise of the Nazi Party (2003).

Among his other books are: The Origins of the First and Second World Wars (1997); The British Empire, 1815–1914 (1994); and Hitler, Chamberlain and Appeasement (2002). In 1998, McDonough was commissioned by the Oxford and Cambridge Examinations Board to write a set text entitled Fascism, Conflict and Communism: European History: 1890–1945.

In recent years, McDonough's published work has been focused on aspects of the history of the Third Reich.

In 2008, McDonough published The Holocaust, with John Cochrane. This book is a new introduction to both the events and the complex international response to the Holocaust and examines the grim reality of life and death in the death camps, the scholarly debates and the impact on popular culture since 1945 of the most horrific aspect of the history of the 20th century.

McDonough is the author of an English-language biography of the German resistance heroine, Sophie Scholl, entitled Sophie Scholl: The Woman Who Defied Hitler, published by the History Press in February 2009.

In September 2011, McDonough published The Origins of the Second World War: An international Perspective, about the outbreak of the Second World War.

In April 2012, the second edition of "Hitler and the Rise of the Nazi Party" was published.

In August 2015, McDonough's study The Gestapo: The Myth and Reality of Hitler's Secret Police was published by the Hodder and Stoughton imprint Coronet. The book is based on original Gestapo files and tells the story of the victims of Nazi Terror. The book has been published in translated versions in Italy (March 2016), Spain (June 2016), Norway (August 2016), Sweden (September 2016), Finland (2016) and Romania (2019).

The paperback version of the Gestapo book was released in September 2016

McDonough has most recently completed a two volume book titled 'The Hitler Years'. The first volume (Triumph 1933–1939) is due to be published on 14 November 2019.

Media appearances and Twitter
McDonough has appeared on TV and radio. He appeared on CrossTalk on Russia Today in 2010, debating whether the Second World War could have been prevented. He featured in the BBC 1 documentary A Tale of Two Rival Cities, which was part of the BBC's "History of the World" project, for which he also acted as Historical Consultant; the documentary won a Royal Television Society Award. He was interviewed in two special programmes on French National Television to mark the 70th anniversary of General de Gaulle's 18 June 1940 speech when he said the "flame of French Resistance cannot be extinguished". McDonough appeared as an historical commentator on France 2 and in a special documentary featuring historians on de Gaulle, broadcast on France 3 on 18 June 2010. He also appeared in the BBC 1 programme Inside Out commenting on a story presented by the actor Paul McGann that looked at whether or not Adolf Hitler visited Liverpool between November 1911 and May 1912. McDonough argued that evidence from Austrian police records, eyewitness accounts from Vienna, and shipping records all strongly indicated that the young Hitler had lived in Vienna at this time, not Liverpool, thus confirming what Hitler claimed in his autobiography, Mein Kampf. In 2012, McDonough appeared in a series on the history of the Third Reich on National Geographic channel entitled Nazi Secrets. He appeared in three episodes: "Hitler's Damned Women", "Hitler's Family Skeletons" and "Hitler's Millions". In November 2013, McDonough was featured in a BBC 1 documentary called The Story of the Swastika and a Channel 5 documentary called 7 Days That Made the Führer. In 2014, McDonough appeared in a 10-part documentary series called The Rise of the Nazi Party on Quest TV, part of the Discovery Channel.

McDonough has a Twitter account called @FXMC1957. It examines key facts in history every morning. McDonough often does Twitter lectures that cover issues such as the JFK assassination, D-Day and the outbreak of WW1 in great depth. He rarely tweets much about his work, his private life or his opinions. The History News Network ranked McDonough's Twitter in the Top 20 History Twitter accounts.

References

External links
 Professor Frank McDonough's official website
 
 
 "Adolf Hitler Liverpool links discussed in new BBC documentary", Liverpool Echo, 28 November 2011

Living people
1957 births
Historians of Nazism
English historians
Academics of Liverpool John Moores University
Alumni of Balliol College, Oxford
Alumni of Lancaster University
Academics from Liverpool